The Hospital of St. Cross is a National Health Service hospital on Barby Road, in Rugby, Warwickshire, England, managed by the University Hospitals Coventry and Warwickshire NHS Trust. It is on the south edge of Rugby above a steep slope running down to the Sow Brook valley.

History

The hospital was founded by Richard Henry Wood DL, a wealthy stockbroker who was originally from Manchester, but who had lived in Rugby for 21 years, and his wife, Elizabeth Wood (née Hatton) to replace an earlier nursing home in Castle Street, which had opened in 1869, and was no-longer adequate for the town's needs. The Woods' donated a plot of land off Barby Road and a donation of a million pounds to build the hospital. Named after the Hospital of St Cross in Winchester, it was designed by Henry Wilson, of Gray's Inn Square, and opened in July 1884. When opened it had three nurses, four support staff, and 31 beds. The hospital has undergone numerous extensions since, with many new buildings added. The original building is still extant. 

The Victoria Diamond Jubilee Wing was opened by the founder in July 1899, the children's wing was opened by Princess Henry of Battenburg in October 1907 and a new out-patient department was opened by the Duchess of York in April 1929. In 1932 a sun pavilion was added on the south side, when fresh air was viewed as an effective treatment. 

It joined the National Health Service in 1948. In the early-1990s, St Cross was further enlarged, after the decision was taken to close St Luke's Hospital in Rugby, and move all of its services to St Cross, this was completed in 1993. A new Diamond Jubilee rehabilitation centre was opened by Princess Alexandra of Kent in April 2014.

Facilities

The hospital has 110 beds and six operating theatres, which specialise in elective surgery. It has an urgent treatment centre for minor injuries and illnesses, which is open every day, 24 hours a day, but does not have a full Accident and Emergency department, the nearest of which is based at University Hospital Coventry. It has a blood taking unit. It also provides rehabilitation, outpatient and screening services. A more extensive range of medical services are provided at the University Hospital Coventry which is the principal hospital serving the Coventry and Rugby area.

Myton Hospice
Sharing the site of St Cross Hospital is Rugby Myton Hospice which was opened in 2002. This is not an NHS facility, but is funded largely by charitable donations.

See also
 List of hospitals in England

References

External links
 Wards are served by Rugby Hospital Radio (RHR)

Buildings and structures in Rugby, Warwickshire
Hospitals in Warwickshire
NHS hospitals in England
Hospitals established in 1884